Lee Byung-il (1910-1978) was a South Korean film director and producer. He debuted with Spring on the Korean Peninsula in 1941, when Korea was still under the Japanese rule. His best known film, The Wedding Day (1956), was screened at the Berlin Film Festival - the first Korean film to do so. Today considered a classic, it has been listed as a Registered Cultural Property by the Korean Government in 2007 and chosen by Korea Post to be commemorated in a 2008 special stamps edition together with three other representative films from 1940-60s. His next film, The Love Marriage (1958), won a special comedy award at Asia-Pacific Film Festival. In his later years he was more active as a producer.

Filmography as director

See also 
List of Korean film directors
Cinema of Korea

References

External links 
 
 

1910 births
People from Hamhung
South Korean film directors
1978 deaths